The Bathinda–Rohtak line is a railway line connecting  in the Indian state of the Punjab and Rohtak in Haryana.The line is under the administrative jurisdiction of Northern Railway.

Stations Between Bathina to Rohtak
 Samar Gopalpur railway station
 Karainthi railway station
 Lakhan Majra railway station
 Kila Zafargarh railway station
 Julana railway station
 Jai Jai Wanti railway station
 Kinana railway station
 Bishanpura Haryana railway station
 Jind railway station
 Barsola railway station
 Gaon Baroda railway station
 Uchana railway station
 Ghaso railway station
 Narwana Junction railway station
 Dharodi railway station
 Dhamtan Sahib railway station
 Kalwan railway station
 Tohana railway station
 Himmatpura railway station
 Jakhal railway station
 Gurnay railway station
 Lehra Gaga railway station
 Govindgarh Khokhar railway station
 Chhajli railway station
 Sunam Udham Singh Wala railway station
 Bharur railway station
 Sangrur railway station
 Bahadur Singh Wala railway station
 Dhuri Junction railway station
 Rajomajra railway station
 Alal railway station
 Sekha railway station
 Barnala railway station
 Hadiyaya railway station
 Ghunas railway station
 Tapa railway station
 Jethuke railway station
 Rampura Phul railway station
 Lehra Muhabbat railway station
 Laihra Khana railway station
 Bhuchchu railway station
 Bathinda Cantt. Outer Cabin railway station
 Bathinda Cantt. railway station
 Bathinda junction railway station

Gauge conversion and electrification
The Bathinda–Rohtak metre-gauge line was converted to -wide broad gauge in 1994.

External links

https://indiarailinfo.com/train/-train-kisan-express-14732/939/109/825[]

References

5 ft 6 in gauge railways in India
Rail transport in Haryana
Rail transport in Punjab, India

Transport in Bathinda
Rohtak district